Otulu is one of the ten villages of Ahiara, Imo State, Nigeria. It has nine hamlets, namely: 

Ihite*
Umuokoro
Umuaghara
Umuagwu
Umugaa
Umuakam
Umuorise
Umuoke
Umuoyaa

The people of Otulu have a large market called Nkwo Otulu. The community is mainly Catholic with Parish called St. Joseph Catholic Parish Otulu. They have one secondary School, Community Secondary School Otulu built by the community in the early eighties. Before the secondary school, there existed two primary schools, St Joseph Primary school Otulu being the foremost and Group School Otulu.

Towns in Imo State
Villages in Igboland